John Thomas (1691–1766) was an English Bishop of Lincoln and Bishop of Salisbury.

Life

Born on 23 June 1691, he was the son of a drayman in Nicholson's brewery in the parish of All Hallows the Great in the City of London, and was sent to the parish school. He was admitted to Merchant Taylors' School on 11 March 1703. He graduated B.A. in 1713 and M.A. in 1717 from Catharine Hall, Cambridge, was made D.D. in 1728, and incorporated at Oxford on 11 July of the same year.

He became chaplain of the English factory at Hamburg, where he was highly popular with the merchants, published a paper in German called the Patriot in imitation of The Spectator, and attracted the notice of George II, who offered him preferment in England, if his ministers would leave him any patronage to bestow. In 1736 he was presented to the rectory of St Vedast Foster Lane; he accompanied the king to Hanover at his personal request. His knowledge of German had commended him to the king, who liked him, and refused to quarrel with him for having dined at Cliefden with Frederick, Prince of Wales. He succeeded Francis Lockyer as dean of Peterborough in 1740, in spite of the opposition of the Duke of Newcastle. In 1743 he was nominated to the bishopric of St Asaph, but was immediately transferred to Lincoln, to which he was consecrated at Lambeth on 1 April 1744.

He was translated to Salisbury in November 1761 (where he was ex officio the Chancellor of the Order of the Garter), died there on 20 July 1766, and was buried in Salisbury Cathedral. His library was sold in 1767. He left one daughter, married to John Taylor, chancellor of Salisbury. Of his four wives, the first was a niece of Bishop Sherlock. The famous wedding-ring 'posy,' 'If I survive I'll make them five,' is attributed to him. Thomas was the author of sermons published between 1739 and 1756.

Notes

References

1691 births
1766 deaths
Deans of Peterborough
Bishops of Lincoln
Bishops of St Asaph
Bishops of Salisbury
English sermon writers
18th-century Church of England bishops
English male non-fiction writers
Chancellors of the Order of the Garter
18th-century Welsh Anglican bishops